Real ale is the name coined by the Campaign for Real Ale (CAMRA) for beer that is "brewed from traditional ingredients, matured by secondary fermentation in the container from which it is dispensed, and served without the use of extraneous carbon dioxide".

Cask and bottle-conditioned beers
Cask and bottle-conditioned beers are referred to as real ale by CAMRA, as both fit its description of beers served from a container in which they have undergone secondary fermentation.

Filtered beer

The fundamental distinctions between real and other ales is that real ale is required to be unfiltered, unpasteurized and served either from a beer engine without the use of extraneous carbon dioxide, or via bottle conditioning. Real ale is not filtered and the yeast is still present and living in the container from which the real ale is served, although it will have settled to the bottom and is usually not poured into the glass. The natural carbon dioxide is lost during filtration so filtered beer has to be artificially re-carbonated. This can make the beer very 'gassy'. Because the yeast is still present and alive in real ale, a slow process of secondary fermentation continues in the cask or bottle on the way to the consumer, allowing the beer to retain its natural carbonation.  Another distinction is that real ale should be served without the aid of added carbon dioxide, or "top pressure" as it is commonly known. Common dispensing methods are the handpump, or "by gravity" direct from the cask. Electric pumps are occasionally seen, especially in the Midlands and Scotland. Water pumps, powered by mains water pressure, were the traditional means of dispensing draught beer in Scotland but this method is discontinued.

Cask breather
A cask breather works by adding carbon dioxide into the cask to replace the beer as it is drawn off, rather than allowing in air, thus extending the beer's saleable life.  However, the added gas is not at the high pressure typical of keg beer.
Before 2018, cask ales which were kept "fresh" by the use of a cask breather were not classified by CAMRA as real ale. In 2018, this policy was changed, allowing pubs using cask breathers to be listed in the Good Beer Guide.

CAMRA
The expression "real ale" has been heavily promoted by CAMRA to attract the attention of the media in the UK. The term was coined in the 1970s, when there were very few independent breweries left, and most production had gone over to filtered and pasteurised ales served under carbon dioxide pressure ("keg beer").

Popularity 
Cask conditioned ale remains popular within the UK, particularly in traditional pubs. In 2019, 420 million pints of cask ale were sold in the UK, accounting for 13.5% of all pints. Cask ale is seen as 'Britain's National Drink', and its 'Britishness' is often seen as an important factor in promoting cask.

See also
 Draught beer
 Real Ale Twats

References

External links
The Directory of UK Real Ale Breweries - Information on real ale brewers in the UK
CAMRA's Good Beer Guide 

Beer in the United Kingdom
Types of beer
Beer culture